The Motorola A760 is a Linux-based camera equipped mobile telephone ('cell phone') developed at Motorola's laboratory in China and released in the Chinese market on February 16, 2003. The particular Linux distribution used was MontaVista Linux.  It is the first phone to use Linux.

Technology 
The A760 is particularly significant in that Motorola was a founding member of the Symbian OS initiative (a software platform competing against Linux, Windows Mobile and Palm OS for mobile phones) and in spite of this, used Linux instead of Symbian for the phone.  As such the A760 may mark the beginning of the use of Linux on mobile phones.  Other newer Motorola phone models which use Linux are the A768 and the E680, as well as the A1200. The A760 is reportedly the world’s first handset combining a Linux Operating System (OS) and Java Technology, with full multimedia PDA functionality and a built-in camera.

The phone's user interface was built using Trolltech's Qtopia Phone Edition platform on top of the Qt/Embedded software development framework for embedded systems.

Features 
The Motorola A760 combines the typical features of a mobile phone with the capabilities of a personal digital assistant (PDA), digital camera, video player, MP3 player, speakerphone, multimedia messaging, instant Internet access, and Bluetooth wireless technology.  Packed into one compact device with a color touch-screen, the Motorola A760 is designed for information management as well as text, entertainment, and, of course voice communication.

See also 
 Embedded Linux
 List of Motorola mobile telephones
 OpenEZX - a project to make the Motorola phones customizable

Motorola smartphones
Mobile phones introduced in 2003
Mobile phones with infrared transmitter